Luís Bullido Arroyo (born 9 October 1978) is a paralympic athlete from Spain competing mainly in category T11 sprint events.

Luis made his first Paralympic games appearance in 1996 competing in the 400m.  He returned to the 2000 Summer Paralympics in Sydney where he competed in the 200m and won a silver in the 400m before helping the Spanish 4 × 400 m to a silver.  His third and final appearance in the Paralympics came in 2004 Summer Paralympics where he won another two silvers in the 200m and 400m and a bronze in the 100m.

Notes

References

External links 
 
 

1978 births
Living people
Spanish male sprinters
Paralympic athletes of Spain
Paralympic silver medalists for Spain
Paralympic bronze medalists for Spain
Paralympic medalists in athletics (track and field)
Paralympic athletes with a vision impairment
Athletes (track and field) at the 1996 Summer Paralympics
Athletes (track and field) at the 2000 Summer Paralympics
Athletes (track and field) at the 2004 Summer Paralympics
Medalists at the 2000 Summer Paralympics
Medalists at the 2004 Summer Paralympics
Visually impaired sprinters
Paralympic sprinters
Spanish blind people